"Mecca" is a 1963 song which was a hit for Gene Pitney.  It was the first release and greatest hit from his LP, Gene Pitney Sings Just for You.

Lyrics
The song starts with "I live on the west side, she lives on the east side of the street."  "Mecca," a city that most of the world is forbidden to visit, symbolizes her side of the street, as the girl's parents forbid the pair to become romantically involved because of their young age.

Charts
In the U.S., "Mecca" peaked at #12 on the pop chart and #4 Easy Listening.  It was a bigger hit in Australia, where it peaked at #7, and in Canada where it reached #2. The B-side, "Teardrop by Teardrop," charted at #130 on the Billboard Bubbling Under the Hot 100 chart.

Chart history

References

External links
 Lyrics of this song
 

1963 songs
1963 singles
Gene Pitney songs
Musicor Records singles